Kulakkattil Geevarghese George (born 24 May 1946) is an Indian film maker and screenwriter who worked in the Malayalam cinema. He was the founder of a new school of film making in Malayalam cinema, along with Bharathan and P. Padmarajan, in the 1980s. He was awarded the J. C. Daniel Award, Government of Kerala's highest honour for contributions to the Malayalam cinema.

George made his debut with Swapnadanam (1975) which won the National Film Award for Best Feature Film in Malayalam. His well-known films include Ulkkadal (1979), Mela (1980), Yavanika (1982), Lekhayude Maranam Oru Flashback (1983), Adaminte Vaariyellu (1983), Panchavadi Palam (1984), Irakal (1986), and Mattoral (1988). He is a recipient of 9 Kerala State Film Awards for his various films.

George is the founder and chairman of the Malayalam Cine Technicians Association (MACTA), and continues to be an executive member. He was the chairman of the Kerala State Film Development Corporation.

Early life 
After his diploma from Film and Television Institute of India (FTII), Pune, K. G. George started his film career as the assistant to director Ramu Kariat. He made his directorial debut with Swapnadanam (1975) and became a strong presence of the new cinema movement that became active during the early 1970s. The film institute may have exposed him to the magic of cinema, but his stint as assistant to the legendary Ramu Kariat in the celebrated Nellu must have instilled in him that quality to jell cinematic norms with commercial elements. He was given the tag of a 'via media director' together with Padmarajan, Bharathan and Mohan, which was a big compliment in the 1980s when most of his movies were hits.

Film career 
His debut movie Swapnadanam was a commercial success while maintaining its artistic quality. It was a marital psychodrama, Swapnadanam rejected all the usual song-dance numbers of popular cinema, yet succeeded in reaching the common mass. Later he turned to the middle-stream cinema and produced some of the best works of Malayalam cinema, which became highly popular with the masses. It was a commercial success as well as critically acclaimed and won several awards. Swapnadanam won the Kerala State Film Award for best film. His another movie released in 1980, Kolangal smithereens the common romantic concept about an interior village of Kerala filled with virtues and happiness. Here a village is shown in the clutches of wildfire of jealousy. Yavanika stands out as one of the most commercially successful, yet artistically superior films of the 1980s. In the form of a detective thriller, Yavanika explores backstage drama of a travelling drama troop. It won the Kerala State Film Award for Best Film. K. G. George uses the cinema within cinema technique for this film. With hints to the real life incident of suicide of popular actress Shobha, Lekhayude Maranam Oru Flashback  became controversial even before its release. He used a new narrative technique Adaminte Variyellu, by telling the story of unhappy marital lives and oppressions suffered by three urban women. Based on short story by Veloor Krishnankutty, George's Panchavadi Palam  is a satirical comedy with intentionally exaggerated story line and caricature-like characters. It works almost as a political cartoon. Irakal is an in-depth exploration of the psychology of violence. A ruthless rubber baron, Mathukutty, disregards the prevailing moral standards and spawns criminal sons as well as a sexually wayward daughter, Annie. His son, Baby is a psychotic strangler who uses a nylon wire and is eventually shot dead by his repentant father.

George's last movie was released in 1998, Elavamkodu Desam, a period movie released when mimicry movies ruled the roost. "The audience somehow did not relate to this movie," he says sadly. In between his first film Swapnadanam and Elavamkodu Desam, he created milestones in Malayalam cinema. Seven of his movies were screened at different international festivals.

He released his memoir Flashback Enteyum Cinemayudeyum in 2012. 
In 2018 a documentary on the films and life of K G George named 8½ Intercuts: Life and Films of K.G. George directed by film maker Lijin Jose released.

Filmography

Awards 
Kerala State Film Awards:
 1975 – Best Film – Swapnadanam
 1975 – Best Screen Play – Swapnadanam
 1978 – Kerala State Film Award for Best film with popular appeal and aesthetic value – Rappadikalude Gatha
 1982 – Best Film – Yavanika
 1982 – Best Story – Yavanika
 1983 – Second Best Film – Adaminte Variyellu
 1983 – Best Story – Adaminte Variyellu
 1985 – Second Best Film – Irakal
 1985 – Best Story – Irakal
 2015 – J. C. Daniel Award (instituted by the Kerala state government, for his lifelong contributions to cinema)

Kerala Film Critics Association Awards:
 1982 – Best Film – Yavanika
 1982 – Best Director – Yavanika
 1985 – Best Director – Irakal
 1985 – Second Best Film – Irakal
 1987 – Second Best Film – Mattoral
 2014 – Chalachitra Ratnam Award

Other awards:
 1976 – Filmfare Special Award - South for Special Commendation Award for Swapnadanam
 2015 – Master's Award from Film Employees Federation of Kerala (FEFKA)
 2015 – Indywood Golden Frame Award for Lifetime achievement (ALIIFF)
 2016 – Muttathu Varkey Award - Irakal
 2017 – Vanitha Film Awards – Lifetime Achievement Award
 2017 – CPC Cine Awards – Special Honorary Award

References

External links 
 
 'Cinema of Malayalam' profile 

1946 births
Living people
J. C. Daniel Award winners
Kerala State Film Award winners
Malayalam screenwriters
20th-century Indian film directors
People from Thiruvalla
Film directors from Kerala
20th-century Indian dramatists and playwrights
Malayalam film directors
Screenwriters from Kerala